Lassana Fané (born 11 November 1987) is a Malian former professional footballer who played as a midfielder.

Club career
Born in Bamako, Mali, Fané began his career in the youth of Djoliba AC and was for the season 2006 promoted to the senior team. In 2008, was voted "most outstanding player" of the Malian Première Division.

On 14 January 2009, after a third season with Djoliba AC, Fané moved to Sudanese Premier League side Al-Merrikh.

In December 2010, he left Al-Merreikh to join Libyan Premier League club Al Ahli Tripoli.

In June 2011 Fané Joined Kuwaiti Premier League side Al Kuwait.

International career
Fané was a member of the Mali national team and played the 2010 Africa Cup of Nations in Angola. He played for his country the Tournoi de l'UEMOA 2008 in Bamako. His last game for Mali was against Malawi in which Mali won 3–1. The game was played on 18 January 2010 and was at the 2010 AFCON.

Honours
 Malian Première Division most outstanding player: 2008

References

External links
 
 
 Profile at Ultrasclub.com

Living people
1987 births
Sportspeople from Bamako
Association football midfielders
Malian footballers
Mali international footballers
2010 Africa Cup of Nations players
Sudan Premier League players
Libyan Premier League players
Kuwait Premier League players
Saudi Professional League players
Botola players
Djoliba AC players
Al-Merrikh SC players
Al-Ahli SC (Tripoli) players
Kuwait SC players
Al-Shoulla FC players
Olympique Club de Khouribga players
Al Batin FC players
21st-century Malian people
Malian expatriate footballers
Malian expatriate sportspeople in Sudan
Expatriate footballers in Sudan
Malian expatriate sportspeople in Libya
Expatriate footballers in Libya
Malian expatriate sportspeople in Kuwait
Expatriate footballers in Kuwait
Malian expatriate sportspeople in Saudi Arabia
Expatriate footballers in Saudi Arabia
Malian expatriate sportspeople in Morocco
Expatriate footballers in Morocco